Zauri Makharadze (born 24 March 1993 in Balta, Odesa Oblast, Ukraine) is a Ukrainian-born Georgian football goalkeeper.

Career
With Olimpik, he won the 2013–14 Ukrainian First League and promotion to the Ukrainian Premier League.

Makharadze was called up for Ukraine u21 team in January 2014 for the 2014 Commonwealth of Independent States Cup.

In 2018 he acquired Georgian citizenship and in May 2018 he was called-up in the Georgia national football team.

On 24 May 2018 manager Roman Sanzhar of Olimpik Donetsk announced that Makharadze signed a pre-contract with the Ukrainian Premier League side Zorya Luhansk. On 25 May the transfer was officially confirmed by Zorya.

References

External links
Profile at Official FFU website

Ukrainian people of Georgian descent
Ukrainian footballers
FC Olimpik Donetsk players
FC Zorya Luhansk players
SC Dnipro-1 players
FC Polissya Zhytomyr players
Association football goalkeepers
1993 births
Living people
People from Balta, Ukraine
Ukrainian Premier League players
Naturalized citizens of Georgia (country)
Ukrainian emigrants to Georgia (country)
Footballers from Georgia (country)
Sportspeople from Odesa Oblast